Troy Roberts may refer to:

 Troy Roberts (journalist) (born 1962), American correspondent
 Troy Roberts (soccer) (born 1983), American soccer player